Lindsay Muir (born 21 June 1957) is a British female balloonist and FAI world record holder, who became European champion in 2012.

In 2010 Muir won silver at 1st FAI Women's European Championships in Alytus, Lithuania. Two years later she became European Champion at the second event in Frankenthal, Germany. She also participated in 1995 12th FAI World Hot Air Ballooning Championships where she finished 6th in open gender classification.

Life 
Muir began flying in 1983 and earned her private Pilot’s Certificate on 21 November 1983, the 200th anniversary of aviation. Later she moved on to become a Commercial Pilot. Since 1989, she has participated in FAI World and European Championships, where for many years she has regularly been the only woman.

On 21 May 2000 Muir set a women's world record in the class AX-10 (hot air balloons from 4000 to 6000 m³). After 19 hours 7 minutes and 55 seconds heavy weather forced her to land. The record was still unbroken 15 years later.

Muir is married to Graham Hallett, Chief Technical Officer of the British Balloon and Airship Club. Their daughter Chloe Hallet is participating in the FAI competitions since 2015, when she was the youngest British balloon pilot at the age of 17. In March 2015, Muir was elected Vice President of the CIA (Commission Internationale d'Aérostation) the FAI's ballooning commission).

Competition record

World Championships 
 12th FAI World Championship in Battle Creek, Michigan, USA, 1995 – 6th (overall)

 1st FAI Women’s World Hot Air Balloon Championship in Leszno, Poland, 2014 – 35th
 2nd FAI Women's World Hot Air Balloon Championship in Birštonas, Lithuania, 2016 – 21st
 3rd FAI Women's World Hot Air Balloon Championship in Nałęczów, Poland, 2018 – 20th

European Championships 
 1st FAI Women’s European Hot Air Balloon Championship in Alytus, Lithuania, 2010 – Vice European Champion
 2nd FAI Women’s European Hot Air Balloon Championship in Frankenthal, Germany, 2012 – European Champion
 3rd FAI Women’s European Hot Air Balloon Championship in Orvelte/Drenthe, Netherlands, 2015 – 12th
 4th FAI Women’s European Hot Air Balloon Championship in Leszno, Poland, 2017 – 4th

British Championships (wins only) 
 Championship 1996 – 1st (overall)
 Championship 1988 – 1st (overall)

FAI Women's World Cup (wins only) 
 World Cup 1991 – 1st
 World Cup 1992 – 1st
 World Cup 1993 – 1st
 World Cup 1996 – 1st

World Air Games 
 World Air Games 1997 – 2nd in hot air ballooning

Links and sources 
 Fédération Aéronautique Internationale: 21 MAY 2000: THE STORY OF LINDSAY MUIR'S HOT AIR BALLOON WORLD RECORD.
 Lindsay Muir.

References 

1957 births
Living people
British balloonists